Diplocanthopoda is a genus of jumping spiders that was first described by H. C. Abraham in 1925.  it contains only two species, found only in Malaysia and Papua New Guinea: D. hatamensis and D. marina.

References

Salticidae genera
Salticidae
Spiders of Asia